The Fire Eater is a 1921 American silent Western film directed by B. Reeves Eason and featuring Hoot Gibson.

Plot
As described in a film magazine, Smilin' Bob Corey (Gibson) and his partner Jim O'Neil (Perry) are rangers employed by the Forestry Preserve Bureau who are directed to make a "peaceful penetration" into Paradise Valley to save timber from the depredations of Jacob Lemar (Lingham), a notorious lumber thief, and the uneducated settlers who are robbing the mountains and valleys of all of the best trees. This makes them the objects of hatred in the camp. Bob falls in love with Martha McCarthy (Lorraine), the daughter of woodsman Day McCarthy (Berrell), who receive Bob and Jim into their home even though they distrust them. After several fights between Bob and Jacob and a spectacular forest fire that sweeps the mountainside, Jacob kidnaps Martha hides her in a bear trap. Bob rescues her and they escape the flames by hiding in a waterhole. Jacob is caught and punished for his part in the kidnapping, and the woodsmen accept Bob and Jim as good fellows on an earnest mission.

Cast
 Hoot Gibson as Bob Corey
 Louise Lorraine as Martha McCarthy
 Walter Perry as Jim O'Neil
 Thomas G. Lingham as Jacob Lemar (credited as Tom Lingham)
 Fred Lancaster as Wolf Roselli
 Carmen Phillips as Marie Roselli
 George Berrell as Day McCarthy
 Bradley Ward as Marty Frame (credited as W. Bradley Ward)
 George A. Williams as Mort Frame

See also
 List of American films of 1921
 Hoot Gibson filmography

References

External links
 
 

1921 films
1921 Western (genre) films
American black-and-white films
Films directed by B. Reeves Eason
Silent American Western (genre) films
Universal Pictures films
1920s American films